David Ames may refer to:

 David Ames (actor) (born 1983), British actor
 David Ames (American footballer) (1937–2009), American football defensive back and halfback
 David Ames (researcher) (born 1954), Australian psychiatrist and academic
 David Ames (field hockey) (born 1989), Northern Irish field hockey player
 David Ames (colonel) (1760–1847), first superintendent of the Springfield Armory

See also
 David Aames, character in 2001 American science fiction psychological thriller film Vanilla Sky
 David Amess (1952–2021), British politician